Lin Meng (Chinese: 林孟, born on July 7, 1993 in Jiamusi, Heilongjiang) is a Chinese female short track speed skater.

References

1993 births
Living people
Chinese female speed skaters
Chinese female short track speed skaters
Universiade medalists in short track speed skating
Universiade gold medalists for China
Competitors at the 2015 Winter Universiade
20th-century Chinese women
21st-century Chinese women